York Against Cancer is a cancer charity based in York, England and founded in 1987. The charity commissioned a £700,000 mobile chemotherapy unit to serve patients of the York Teaching Hospital NHS Foundation Trust and which, when launched in July 2017, was the first of its kind in Yorkshire.

References

External links
 Official website

Cancer organisations based in the United Kingdom
Health charities in England
Organisations based in York
Organizations established in 1987
1987 establishments in England